Alliance for Constitutional Sex Offense Laws (ACSOL) is a nonprofit civil rights, legal reform, and support organization, with offices in Los Angeles and Sacramento. ACSOL advocates for civil rights for those required to register as sex offenders, and their families. ACSOL was formerly known as California Reform Sex Offender Laws (CA RSOL).

Activism
ACSOL has been active in legal battles challenging local Halloween ordinances, and proximity and residency restrictions aimed at registrants in federal court across the state of California. Due to lawsuits, paroled registrants in California are no longer required to post a sign on the front door of their residence on Halloween.

Due to the proximity restrictions lawsuits, registrants in California are currently allowed to visit public and private places throughout the state. In 2015, ACSOL began a series of lawsuits in state of California soon after the California Supreme Court ruled San Diego residency restrictions unconstitutional. As of June 2019, a total of 36 lawsuits had been filed across the state.

In 2016 ACSOL participated in a challenge to the International Megan's Law (IML), passed by Congress and signed into law by President Obama, in February 2016. The lawsuit was filed on February 9, 2016, but was dismissed by the United States District Court

See also
 National Association for Rational Sexual Offense Laws
 Women Against Registry
 Illinois Voices for Reform

References

Sex offender registries in the United States